The 2000 Munster Senior Hurling Championship Final (sponsored by Guinness) was a hurling match played on Sunday 2 July 2000 at Semple Stadium, Thurles, County Tipperary,. It was contested by Cork and Tipperary. Cork captained by Fergal Ryan claimed the title beating Tipperary on a scoreline of 0-23 to 3-12. The match was shown live in Ireland as part of the Sunday Game live on RTÉ Two.

References

Munster
Munster Senior Hurling Championship Finals
Cork county hurling team matches
Tipperary GAA matches